"The Last Farewell" is a song from 1971 by British folk singer Roger Whittaker (music and vocals on original recording) and Ron A .Webster (poem and lyrics). Whittaker hosted a radio programme in The United Kingdom in 1971, backed by an orchestra with arrangements by Zack Lawrence. Whittaker says "one of the ideas I had was to invite listeners to send their poems or lyrics to me and I would make songs out of them. We got a million replies, and I did one each week for 26 weeks."

Ron A. Webster, a silversmith from Birmingham, England, sent Whittaker his poem entitled "The Last Farewell", and this became one of the selections to appear on the radio program. It was recorded, and featured on Whittaker's 1971 album New World in the Morning (A Special Kind of Man in the US and Canada). It is one of the fifty all-time singles to have sold 10 million (or more) physical copies worldwide.

Popularity
According to Whittaker, the wife of a program director for a radio station in Atlanta, Georgia, was travelling in Canada, in 1975, and heard Whittaker's four-year-old recording on the radio. After she returned to the United States, she asked her husband to play it on the station. After he played the song a few times, listeners called the station to discover more about the song and singer, and soon thereafter "The Last Farewell" was on the charts. The single reached the Top 20 on the Billboard Hot 100 chart, peaking at number 19 in June 1975, the only single of Whittaker's career to appear on the Hot 100. It also went to number 1 on the Billboard adult contemporary chart.

The response in America led the single to achieve success in other parts of the world, including in the United Kingdom, peaking at number 2 on the UK Singles Chart. It was kept from number 1 in the UK by Rod Stewart's "Sailing", resulting in an oddity that the top 2 songs in the UK singles chart at the time had a nautical theme. "The Last Farewell" also went to number 1 in 11 other countries, selling an estimated 11 million copies worldwide, making it Whittaker's best-known song.

Whittaker says much of the appeal of "The Last Farewell" comes from the classical-sounding nature of the opening French horn solo. This arrangement was done by Zack Lawrence for the song's initial airing on Whittaker's radio programme.

From the mid-1970s until about 1981, WGN-TV, "Chicago's Very Own Channel Nine" used the introductory fanfare in its station identification.

Cover versions
The song has since been covered by many artists. In 1976, Elvis Presley included "The Last Farewell" on his album, From Elvis Presley Boulevard, Memphis, Tennessee. This version was released as a posthumous single in the UK in 1984, peaking at number 48 in December.

Also reaching the UK singles chart with a version of "The Last Farewell" was the Marine Band of HMS Ark Royal, just before the aircraft carrier was decommissioned by the Royal Navy in December 1978. It peaked at number 41 in January 1979.

Östen Warnerbring wrote lyrics in Swedish called Ännu kan en sjöman längta hem ("Still, a seaman can long home"), and recorded the song on his 1976 eponymous album. and by Vikingarna on the 1977 album Kramgoa låtar 5. With other lyrics, Å vi e AIK, the song has been used as fight song for AIK.

See also
List of number-one adult contemporary singles of 1975 (U.S.)

Weekly charts

Year-end charts

References

1971 songs
1975 singles
Roger Whittaker songs
Elvis Presley songs
Chet Atkins songs
British songs
Schlager songs
Vikingarna (band) songs
Östen Warnerbring songs